City State of the Invincible Overlord is a fantasy role-playing game supplement originally published by Judges Guild in 1976. It was the first published fantasy role-playing game city setting, designed for use with Dungeons & Dragons (D&D), and officially approved for use with D&D from 1976 through 1983. It was later republished under license by Necromancer Games.

Development and release
Bob Bledsaw and Bill Owen founded Judges Guild in 1976 to sell subscriptions to gamemasters, and began work on a large map inspired by Bledsaw's own Dungeons & Dragons campaign, as a product to make sales. They finished this first product, City State of the Invincible Overlord, just in time for Gen Con IX (1976). A cumulative sales listing shows that City State of the Invincible Overlord sold over 40,000 units by 1981.

City State of the Invincible Overlord launched Judges Guild as a company, and was the centerpiece of Wilderlands of High Fantasy, the first licensed and published Dungeons & Dragons campaign setting.

After ceasing publication, Judges Guild licensed a City State of the Invincible Overlord line to Mayfair Games from 1987 to 1989.

Bob Bledsaw led Judges Guild back to the internet in early 1999 to sell Judges Guild products that had been long warehoused, including a new printing of City State of the Invincible Overlord (1999).

Judges Guild announced a partnership with Necromancer Games in June 2002, who began releasing products by Judges Guild in 2003, including large collectors' editions of City State of the Invincible Overlord (2004) and Wilderlands of High Fantasy (2005).

Editions
The City-State has gone through several editions:
 Judges Guild: Campaign Installment I (1976), 16-page booklet (D&D) 
 Judges Guild: Guide to the City State (1977), 56-page booklet (D&D)
 Judges Guild: Revised City State of the Invincible Overlord (1978–1980, three printings), 80-page book.(D&D)
 Judges Guild: Revised City State of the Invincible Overlord (1981–1983, three printings), 96-page book. (1983 edition had "Approved for use with D&D" removed from cover)
 Mayfair Games: Revised City State of the Invincible Overlord (1987) 
 Judges Guild: Reprinted edition of 1981-83 edition of Revised City State of the Invincible Overlord (1999), 96-page book (D&D)
 Necromancer Games: City State of the Invincible Overlord (2004), 288-page hardcover book (revised d20)

Contents
The City State of the Invincible Overlord setting itself was a single city, the dwarven fortress and town of Thunderhold, designed to be both as a base for campaigning, as well as a seed for city-based adventures. A second product, Wraith Overlord, explored the city's subterranean cellars, sewers and catacombs.

The Judges Guild editions published from 1976 to 1983 contained an overview of the city, and contained a large 34" x 44" four-page map of the town. Other resources in the book included descriptions of notable inhabitants of the town, a table of random encounters, and a list of rumors that the gamemaster could incorporate into the game.

The Mayfair Games edition (1987) came as a boxed set that included a four-page introduction, an 80-page Map & Population book, a 32-page Background & Encounter book, a large full-color map with the city on the front and an island campaign setting on the reverse, a large Players' Map, a 16-page adventure book, four 8-page Race Guides, and two plastic overlay sheets for city and wilderness travel.

The Necromancer Games edition (2004) was a reprint of the 1983 edition with an updated booty list.

Reception
In the October-November 1977 edition of White Dwarf (Issue #3), Don Turnbull gave a thumbs up to the 1977 Judges Guild edition, saying, "The result is something of a triumph, a labour of love (and considerable headache) for the designer and coordinator. It should be welcome in any fantasy gamer's collection."

Patrick Amory reviewed City State of the Invincible Overlord for Different Worlds magazine and stated that "the City-State generally deserves the praise it gets and is well-worth the money".

In the August 1988 edition of Dragon (Issue #136), Jim Bambra was impressed with the production values of the 1987 Mayfair edition, calling it "an impressive looking package." But Bambra was disappointed by the contents compared to the original Judges Guild editions, saying, "Gone are the winding alleys and jumbled buildings, now replaced by a pretty but unconvincing suburban playground. Buildings stand in their own spacious grounds, making the city look like nothing more than a sprawling village enclosed by stout stone walls. No longer are there alleys to get mugged in after dark. Gone are the overcrowded streets. This city is a town-planner’s dream. As such, it is hardly the stuff of a bustling fantasy city." He did enjoy the Background & Encounter Book, which he found to be "vibrant and exciting", but found that "As it stands, the city exists on its own, with its background seemingly tacked on as an afterthought." He concluded with a firm thumbs down, saying, "The revised City-State of the Invincible Overlord set is a good example of how not to go about designing a city. It lacks a cohesive feel, and any atmosphere the City-State may have had is lost in a mass of individual location descriptions. Ten years ago, this would have been acceptable; today, it’s lackluster and boring. Instead of rectifying the faults of the original, Mayfair has amplified them."

References

Dungeons & Dragons campaign settings
Fictional city-states
Judges Guild fantasy role-playing game supplements
Role-playing game supplements introduced in 1976